Senator Gunderson may refer to:

Carl Gunderson (1864–1933), South Dakota State Senate 
Jerome O. Gunderson (1923–2016), Minnesota State Senate